Mandi district is one of the central districts of Himachal Pradesh state in northern India. The town of Mandi is the headquarters of the district.

The main native language is Mandeali.

As of 2011 it is the second most populous district of Himachal Pradesh (out of 12), after Kangra.

Demographics

According to the 2011 census Mandi district has a population of 999,777, roughly equal to the nation of Fiji or the US state of Montana. This gives it a ranking of 446th in India (out of a total of 640). Its population growth rate over the decade 2001-2011 was 10.89%. Mandi has a sex ratio of 1012 females for every 1000 males and a literacy rate of 82.81%. 6.27% of the population lives in urban areas. Scheduled Castes and Scheduled Tribes make up 29.38% and 1.28% of the population respectively.

At the 2011 census, 59.11% of the population in the district identified their first language as Mandeali, 33.32% opted for Pahari (a term broadly applicable to most Indo-Aryan languages of Himachal and Uttarakhand), while 4.1% chose Hindi, 0.66% – Punjabi and 0.47% – Kangri.

Subdivisions
Mandi district Divived in to 12 Sub divisions:
Mandi Sadar
Balh
Sundar Nagar
Sarkaghat
Dharampur
Joginder Nagar
Padhar
Gohar
Thunag
Karsog
Balichoki
Kotli

Villages in the district include Janjheli. It is near Kullu-Manali, around 80 km from Bhunter Airport, 90 km from Kullu and 67 km from Mandi. It has thick forests and springs and is a trekking/hiking outpost. Shikari Devi is a tourist spot. It hosts Himachal Cultural Village, an ethnic village highlighting the culture of Himachal Pradesh.

Politics 

 

|}

Education

Universities and colleges

Indian Institute of Technology Mandi (IIT Mandi)
Jawaharlal Nehru Government Engineering College
Sardar Vallabhbhai Patel Cluster University
Shri Lal Bahadur Shastri Government Medical College & Hospital Mandi
College of Horticulture and Centre of Excellence for Horticulture Research and Extension, Thunag
Atal Bihari Vajpayee University of Medicine and Health Sciences (upcoming)

Schools
 Jawahar Navodaya Vidyalaya, Mandi

Polytechnics
 Govt Polytechnic Sundernagar
 Industrial Training Institute (ITI) Mandi

Sports
The district is home to the Bandy Federation of India which is a member of the IOC recognized Federation of International Bandy.

See also
Jaidevi

References

External links

 Mandi district website
 DISTRICT PROFILE
 CULTURAL & TOURISM HERITAGE OF THE DISTT
 Janjehli Valley Himachal Pradesh

 
Districts of Himachal Pradesh
1954 establishments in Himachal Pradesh